Ayesha Jalal (Punjabi) is a Pakistani-American historian who serves as the Mary Richardson Professor of History at Tufts University, and was the recipient of the 1998 MacArthur Foundation Fellowship.

Family and early life
Ayesha Jalal was born in Lahore, Pakistan in 1956, the daughter of Hamid Jalal, a senior Pakistani civil servant, and his wife Zakia Jalal. She is related in two ways to the Urdu writer Saadat Hasan Manto. Ayesha's paternal grandmother (Hamid Jalal's mother) was the sister of Manto. Secondly, Manto's wife Safia was the sister of Ayesha's mother Zakia Jalal. In other words, the uncle-nephew pair of Manto and Hamid Jalal were married to the sisters Safia and Zakia.

Jalal is married to the distinguished Indian historian Sugata Bose, who is a professor of history at Harvard. He is a grand-nephew of the Indian Bengali freedom fighter Subhash Chandra Bose.

Education
Jalal came to New York City at the age of 14, when her father was posted at the Pakistan Mission to the United Nations. She obtained her BA, majoring in History and Political Science, from Wellesley College, USA, and her doctorate in history from Trinity College at University of Cambridge, where she wrote her Ph.D. dissertation: 'Jinnah, the Muslim League and the Demand for Pakistan'.

Ayesha Jalal studied at Wellesley College before moving to Trinity College, Cambridge where she received her doctorate in 1983.  She stayed at Cambridge until 1987, working as a fellow of Trinity College and later as a Leverhulme Fellow. She moved to Washington, D.C. in 1985, to work as a fellow at the Woodrow Wilson Center and later as Academy Scholar at the Harvard University's Academy for International and Area Studies. She was hired by Columbia University as an associate professor in 1991 but her tenureship was declined after review in 1995. In 1999, she joined Tufts University as a tenured professor.

The bulk of her work deals with the creation of Muslim identities in modern South Asia.

Career
Ayesha Jalal has been Fellow of Trinity College, Cambridge (1980–1984), Leverhulme Fellow at the Center of South Asian Studies, Cambridge (1984–1987), Fellow of the Woodrow Wilson Center for International Scholars in Washington, DC (1985–1986), Academy Scholar at Harvard University's Academy for International and Area Studies (1988–1990), associate professor at Columbia University's Department of History (1991–1995). She has taught at the University of Wisconsin–Madison, Tufts University, Columbia University, Harvard University and Lahore University of Management Sciences.

Jalal sued Columbia University alleging bias after her tenure review for a professorship was declined in 1995. The suit was dismissed for lack of evidence of discrimination.

Ayesha Jalal is among the most prominent American academics who write on the history of South Asia. In her book, The Sole Spokesman (Cambridge University Press, 1985 and 1994), Jalal gives her perspective of what happened in the years between the 1937 elections in British India and the Partition of the Indian subcontinent, identifying the factors which led to the creation of Pakistan and provides new insights into the nature of the British transfer of power in India. In particular, she focuses on the role of Mohammad Ali Jinnah, the leader of  All-India Muslim League, and the main proponent of the Two Nation Theory on which the demand for Pakistan was based. Jinnah claimed to be the sole spokesman of all the Indian Muslims, not only in provinces where they were in a majority but also in the provinces where they were in a minority. Yet given the political geography of the subcontinent, it was clear that there would always be as many Muslims outside a specifically Muslim state as inside it. This book investigates how Jinnah proposed to resolve the contradiction between assertions of a "separate Muslim nation" and the need for a strategy which could safeguard the interests of all Indian Muslims. It does so by identifying Jinnah's real political aims, the reasons why he was reluctant to bring them into the open, and his success or failure in achieving them.

Awards
A leading historian of Pakistan as well as South Asia, Ayesha Jalal has received numerous awards and acknowledgements: 
Trinity College, Cambridge Fellowship (1980–84) 
 MacArthur Foundation Fellowship (1998-2003)
Sitara-i-Imtiaz (Star of Distinction) by the President of Pakistan in 2009.

Praise
The Hindu, a newspaper of record in India, calls her, "...one of Pakistan's most acclaimed historians..." The Express Tribune, a Pakistani newspaper states, "...Jalal is revered globally as a historian of meticulous methods."

On April 16, 2016, Maleeha Lodhi, Pakistani ambassador to the UN, said that she was “the greatest historian Pakistan has produced.”

Books 

 
  First published 1985.

Chapters in books

References

External links
 Ayesha Jalal profile on Tufts University website
 

1956 births
Living people
Columbia University faculty
Historians of South Asia
MacArthur Fellows
Harvard University alumni
Punjabi academics
Recipients of Sitara-i-Imtiaz
Pakistani emigrants to the United States
Historians of Pakistan
Tufts University faculty
Stuyvesant High School alumni
Wellesley College alumni
Alumni of Trinity College, Cambridge
Fellows of Trinity College, Cambridge
Academic staff of Lahore University of Management Sciences
Punjabi people
Punjabi women
American people of Punjabi descent
American academics of Pakistani descent
20th-century American historians
21st-century American historians